KUSA (channel 9) is a television station in Denver, Colorado, United States, affiliated with NBC. It is owned by Tegna Inc. alongside MyNetworkTV affiliate KTVD (channel 20). Both stations share studios on East Speer Boulevard in Denver's Speer neighborhood, while KUSA's transmitter is located atop Lookout Mountain, near Golden. In addition to its main studios, the station also operates a secondary studio and news bureau on Riverside Avenue in Fort Collins.

History

Early years to the mid-1990s
The station first signed on the air on October 12, 1952, as KBTV; it was the second television station to sign on in the Denver market—after KFEL-TV (channel 2, now KWGN-TV), which signed on just over three months earlier on July 18. Founded by Mullins Broadcasting, the station initially served as a primary affiliate of CBS, but also carried programs from ABC and NBC through secondary affiliations with both networks. It originally operated from studio facilities located in a converted former car dealership at 1089 Bannock Street in Denver's Civic Center neighborhood. Channel 9 gained an affiliation with the DuMont Television Network in 1953, but lost CBS programming to KLZ-TV (channel 7, now KMGH-TV) when that station signed on in November of that year; this was followed by the loss of the NBC affiliation to KOA-TV (channel 4, now KCNC-TV) when it signed on a month later (both KLZ-TV and KOA-TV inherited the affiliations as a result of their sister radio stations' respective longtime affiliations with the CBS Radio Network and the NBC Red Network). This left KBTV as a primary DuMont and secondary ABC affiliate. It would become a full-time ABC affiliate when DuMont ceased operations in 1956. Its radio news partner was KBTR (now KNUS); both stations were owned by Mullins Broadcasting, and the radio partnership lasted until the mid-1980s.

 In 1972, Mullins Broadcasting sold KBTV and sister station KARK-TV (channel 4) in Little Rock, Arkansas, to the Combined Communications Corporation, owned jointly by Phoenix advertising mogul Karl Eller and Chicago advertiser John J. Louis Sr., which already owned its flagship advertising business and stations KTAR-AM and KTAR-TV (channel 12, now KPNX-TV). Combined's station properties would eventually be merged into the Gannett Company seven years later in May 1978, in what was the largest media merger in United States history at the time.

In order to align itself with Gannett's new newspaper entity USA Today, the station changed its call letters to KUSA-TV on March 19, 1984 (Minneapolis–Saint Paul sister station WTCN underwent a similar rebranding in 1985, when it changed its call letters to WUSA; however, after Gannett purchased Washington, D.C. station WDVM-TV in 1986, it moved the WUSA call letters to its newly acquired station; the Minneapolis station that originally held the WUSA calls was renamed KARE-TV). The KBTV call letters are now at a station in Beaumont, Texas. In April 1992, KUSA moved its operations into a new state-of-the-art facility at 500 Speer Boulevard (the original studio location was subsequently occupied by PBS member station KRMA-TV (channel 6)).

NBC affiliation (1995-present)

On July 14, 1994, as a result of an affiliation agreement between the E. W. Scripps Company and ABC that was spurred by Fox's affiliation deal with New World Communications, CBS and Westinghouse Broadcasting (Group W) agreed to a long-term affiliation deal that saw longtime ABC affiliate WJZ-TV in Baltimore and longtime NBC affiliates KYW-TV in Philadelphia and WBZ-TV in Boston become CBS affiliates. Westinghouse's other two stations, KDKA-TV in Pittsburgh and KPIX-TV in San Francisco, were already longtime CBS affiliates. That November, NBC traded KCNC-TV, which was the network's owned-and-operated station at the time, to CBS in return for CBS' former O&O in Philadelphia, WCAU, as a result of a complex ownership deal between the network, Westinghouse and NBC. CBS had originally planned to sell WCAU to NBC as part of its plan to move its affiliation to KYW-TV, but discovered that an outright sale would incur heavy capital gains taxes on proceeds from the deal. To make the transaction a legal trade, the network swapped ownership of KCNC-TV and KUTV in Salt Lake City (which NBC had acquired earlier that year), along with the VHF channel 4 frequency and transmitter in Miami (then home to WTVJ), to CBS in exchange for WCAU and the channel 6 frequency in Miami (then home to WCIX, which subsequently became WFOR-TV). NBC then signed an affiliation agreement with KUSA, bypassing Denver's incumbent CBS affiliate, KMGH-TV.

Gannett then signed a multi-station affiliation agreement with NBC that included KUSA. This resulted in all three of Denver's "Big Three" stations swapping affiliations at 12:07 a.m. on September 10, 1995, which resulted in KUSA switching to NBC, KMGH switching to ABC, and KCNC switching to CBS; Westinghouse had purchased CBS in a group deal one month before, making KCNC a CBS owned-and-operated station when the deal was finalized on November 24 of that year. The final ABC program to air on channel 9 was a repeat of the ABC Saturday Night at the Movies feature Gremlins 2: The New Batch, on September 9, 1995. 

In July 1996, Rapid City NBC affiliate KEVN-TV opted to join Fox, leaving the Black Hills region of South Dakota without a full-power NBC affiliate. As a result, most cable providers in that region began piping in KUSA. Channel 9 served as the market's default NBC affiliate until 1998, when KNBN-LP signed on as the network's new affiliate for the Black Hills region; that station was not carried on cable until it was upgraded to full-power as KNBN on May 14, 2000.

In August 2007, KUSA began the "9NEWS High School Hotshots Program", which awarded one of twelve student athletes from Colorado's high schools nominated for their academic excellence, selected by the school's administration and staff that recorded their high school football games; the program has since extended to cover winter sports at the schools.

Like many Gannett stations, KUSA dropped the "-TV" suffix ten days after the official digital television transition date of June 12, 2009, although KUSA had made the transition to digital-exclusive broadcasts nearly two months earlier.

Around the first week of October 2012, Gannett entered a dispute against Dish Network regarding compensation fees and Dish's AutoHop commercial-skip feature on its Hopper digital video recorders. Gannett ordered that Dish discontinue AutoHop on the account that it is affecting advertising revenues for KUSA and KTVD, thus taking a big chunk out of the pockets of potential advertisers in the Rocky Mountains. Gannett threatened to pull all of its stations (including KUSA and KTVD) should the skirmish continue beyond October 7 and Dish and Gannett fail to reach an agreement. The two parties eventually reached an agreement after extending the deadline for a few hours.

On June 29, 2015, the Gannett Company split in two, with one side specializing in print media and the other side specializing in broadcast and digital media. KUSA and KTVD were retained by the latter company, named Tegna.

Programming
Syndicated programming seen on KUSA includes Entertainment Tonight, Extra, and repeats of The Doctors in the overnight hours. The station clears the entire NBC schedule, although it airs the fourth hour of Today one hour later than most NBC affiliates at 11:00 a.m., and until September 2022, aired Days of Our Lives (now streaming exclusively on Peacock) at 2:00 p.m. (the secondary slot to NBC's primary recommended 1:00 p.m. timeslot), with syndicated programs airing in the preceding hour (Days aired on KUSA at 3:00 p.m. upon joining NBC in 1995 and continued to air in that slot until the fall of 2003, when it acquired Ellen and moved Days to 1:00 p.m., where it remained until the 2007 cancellation of Passions). It also airs NBC's Heart of a Champion on Wednesday afternoons instead of the show's recommended early Saturday afternoon time slot (most NBC stations air it at 12:30 p.m. on Saturdays).

The station struggled in the ratings for several years, in part because ABC's overall ratings were not on par with the other major networks until the 1970s. The station lost the DuMont affiliation when the network shut down on August 6, 1956, which left the station as an exclusive ABC affiliate. In 1969, the station gained some national attention for refusing to air the ABC sketch comedy series Turn-On as the network's affiliates east of the Rocky Mountains voiced displeasure about the program's risqué content during the airing of the pilot episode, with some pulling the program off the air during its broadcast, leading to its cancellation by the network after just one episode.

On the day KUSA joined NBC, it took over KCNC's role as the default home station for the Denver Broncos (who are part of the AFC, which NBC held the broadcast rights to then, channel 4 had aired most Broncos games from 1965 until the 1995 season-opening game a week before the switch), but would only hold this role for only three seasons; however, channel 9 did air the Broncos' first Super Bowl victory in Super Bowl XXXII in 1998 (it also happened to be the last Broncos game aired on the station [and the last NFL game for NBC] for eight years); after this, KCNC, thanks to CBS' acquisition of the AFC broadcast rights, resumed its role as the home station of the team. Since 2006, Broncos games are aired on channel 9 when they are shown on NBC's Sunday Night Football. KUSA also aired any Denver Nuggets contests via the NBA on NBC through 2002, and Colorado Avalanche games via the NHL on NBC from 2006 to 2021.

KUSA produces a daily lifestyle program called Colorado & Company, that features paid segments by local companies and made its debut in September 2004; it airs at 10:00 a.m. following the third hour of Today. Colorado & Company was rebroadcast on KPXC-TV (channel 59) from its debut, until the conclusion of NBC's affiliate partnership and partial ownership of Pax TV in June 2005. KUSA ran the Gannett ID and sounder (often colloquially nicknamed the "Death Star") at the end of the station's weeknight 6:00 p.m. newscasts from 1994 to 2011; in June 2011, KUSA began to show Gannett's new corporate ID tag at the end of all of the station's newscasts, except for the weekday morning programs; as of December 2015, they show Tegna's ID after all of their newscasts.

News operation

KUSA presently broadcasts a total of 35 hours of locally produced newscasts each week (with 5½ hours on weekdays, 3½ hours on Saturdays and four hours on Sundays); this does not account for newscasts aired on KTVD (Combined however, 9 News broadcasts 55½ hours of local news, and has the second highest local newscast output in the state of Colorado behind Nexstar's KDVR and KWGN combined). The station also provides daily weather forecasts for the formerly co-owned Fort Collins Coloradoan newspaper. Until November 2016, KUSA provided local weather updates for six radio stations owned by Entercom: KQMT (99.5 FM), KALC (105.9 FM), K276FK (103.1 FM), KQKS (107.5 FM), KKSE (950 AM) and KEZW (1430 AM); this partnership began on January 1, 2008, after the station's agreement to provide forecasts for KOA (850 AM) radio ended. Weather segments during the station's newscasts are typically presented in the "9 Back Yard", a courtyard outside the Speer Boulevard studios that features a chroma key wall and robotic camera (local weather inserts for The Today Show and updates for 9NEWS Now are done from a chroma key wall inside the weather center).

In addition to its main studios in downtown Denver, KUSA operates a "Northern Newsroom" that based out of the Coloradoan offices in Fort Collins; the bureau employs a rotating staff of reporters and photojournalists out of Denver. The station also operates a "Mountain Newsroom" based in Silverthorne. The station's weather radar is presented on-air as "HD-Doppler 9", a DWSR-10001C radar model supplied by Enterprise Electronics Corporation that is located near Elizabeth and operates at a radiated power of 1 million watts. KUSA brands its websites and sister television properties under the "9NEWS Networks" banner (described by KUSA as its three websites: 9News.com, m.9News.com and HighSchoolSports.net; KTVD (channel 20) and its website; the 9NEWS Now digital subchannel; Metromix; Telemundo owned-and-operated station KDEN-TV (channel 25, whose Spanish-language newscasts are produced by KUSA through a news share agreement) and the "9NEWS Weather Call" weather alert service).

For the better part of the last four decades, KUSA's newscasts (currently titled as 9NEWS) have dominated Denver's local news ratings. In February 1976, Ed Sardella and John Rayburn anchored the weeknight editions of the 10:00 p.m. newscast, helping that program overtake longtime leader KMGH-TV for first place in the ratings; Rayburn was succeeded by Mike Landess in 1977. Landess and Sardella would remain as channel 9's top anchor team until Landess left for KUSA's Atlanta sister station WXIA-TV in late 1993. Adele Arakawa, who had been an anchor at WBBM-TV in Chicago, was hired to succeed Landess. Sardella retired from the anchor desk in 2000, and was succeeded by Jim Benemann, but returned briefly in 2003 to replace Benemann when he left for KCNC-TV. Landess, after anchoring at WTTG in Washington, D.C., returned to Denver at rival KMGH-TV in 2002.

The "KUSA News Package" (created by Third Street Music) was commissioned by KUSA as the theme music for its newscasts in 1995. Scenes for the NBC made-for-TV movie Asteroid were shot at the KUSA studios, the producers filmed the fictional news reports seen in the movie out of the station's 1996–2004 news set. On October 15, 2008, KUSA debuted a standardized graphics package for the Gannett stations created by the Gannett Graphics Group, along with a standardized music package composed by Rampage Music New York. The closing cut of the previous theme was last used on February 6, 2009, and the remastered talent bumper cut was used until January 10, 2013 (Minneapolis sister station KARE continued to use its own custom theme composed in 1996 by Third Street Music called the "KARE 11 News Theme" until January 25, 2013, when it discontinued it for a new standardized news package by Gari Media Group called "This Is Home"). KUSA formerly rebroadcast its weeknight 6:00 and 10:00 p.m. newscasts on KPXC-TV as part of an agreement between NBC and Pax TV to provide news rebroadcasts from the network's stations on Pax's owned-and-operated stations nationally, which ended in June 2005 upon that network's rebrand to I: Independent Television.

In April 2004, KUSA became the first television station in the Denver market, the first Gannett-owned station and the second U.S. television station to begin producing its local newscasts in high definition. On September 5, 2006, KUSA began to produce a daily half-hour prime time newscast at 9:00 p.m. on sister station KTVD, coinciding with that station's affiliation switch from UPN to MyNetworkTV; this expanded on December 5, 2006 to include a two-hour extension of KUSA's weekday morning newscast from 7:00 to 9:00 a.m. and later to weekend morning newscasts at 6:00 a.m. on KTVD. During the November 2007 sweeps period, KCNC's newscasts surged over KUSA in the 5:00 p.m. timeslot for the first time in over a decade, that station also overtook KUSA in overall sign-on to sign-off numbers (this is partially due to KCNC's shift towards investigative reports and human interest stories, though the strength of CBS' prime time lineup and viewership declines for NBC prime time also played a factor). Overall, KUSA remains the highest-rated local news outlet in the market despite a very close ratings battle between it, KCNC-TV and KMGH-TV.

On March 6, 2009, KUSA began streaming its noon newscast on the station's website, with a live chat room feature included next to the streaming player (the station now streams all newscasts seen on KUSA and KTVD). In June 2010, KUSA expanded its weekday morning newscast to 2½ hours with the addition of a half-hour at 4:30 a.m.; the KUSA-produced 9:00 p.m. newscast on KTVD also expanded to one hour that month. On February 20, 2012, KUSA updated its HD-ready set constructed in 2004 to feature a new backdrop for its daytime newscasts that is a variant of its evening backdrop photograph in a daytime setting. On June 3 of that year, KUSA's newscasts were relocated to a temporary set in "Studio B" for two weeks while their primary news set received updated duratrans.

In January 2016, KUSA announced that they would be constructing a brand new studio to "better cover and explain the news." The new studio and set, which was completed in March, replaced the previous one, which debuted in 2004. Newscasts were relocated to the news room temporarily before moving to another temporary set.

Reception
In 1986, the Committee for Skeptical Inquiry (CSICOP) presented anchor and investigative reporter Ward Lucas with the Responsibility in Journalism award, "In recognition of contributions to fair and balanced reporting of paranormal claims".

Notable former on-air staff
 Adele Arakawa – main anchor (1993–2017; now retired and living in Phoenix)
 Heidi Collins – anchor/reporter (1999–2002; later anchor at KMSP-TV in Minneapolis)
 Kevin Corke – sports anchor/reporter (1989–1999; now at Fox News)
 Tom Costello – reporter (1988–1994; now with NBC News as a correspondent for NBC Nightly News, The Today Show, CNBC and MSNBC)
 Monica Gayle – anchor (1980s; later anchor at WJBK in Detroit, now retired)
 Phil Keating – lead reporter (1994–2000; now at Fox News Channel)
 Bill Kuster – weather anchor (1979–1996; died 2006)
 Regis Philbin – fill-in sports anchor (1974; died on July 24, 2020)
 Leon "Stormy" Rottman – chief meteorologist (1969–1988; died 1993)
 Ed Sardella – weeknight anchor (1974–2000, 2003; now retired and living in Denver)

In popular culture
A newscast from the station (as KBTV) was featured prominently in the 1980 Stanley Kubrick film The Shining, set in Colorado.

Technical information

Subchannels
The station's digital signal is multiplexed:

In April 2005, KUSA began carrying NBC Weather Plus on its second digital subchannel (branded as "9NEWS Weather Plus"). On December 31, 2008, following NBC Weather Plus' shutdown, KUSA affiliated the subchannel with The Local AccuWeather Channel; on May 27, 2013, as part of a multi-station deal between Gannett and the network, KUSA 9.2 switched its affiliation to WeatherNation TV. Digital subchannel 9.2 is carried on cable through Comcast digital channel 249 and CenturyLink Prism channel 10. On August 27, 2017 at noon MDT, KUSA temporarily switched digital subchannel 9.2 from WeatherNation TV to a live feed of a WFAA/KHOU simulcast covering the aftermath of Hurricane Harvey after it flooded the Houston metro area. This simulcast ended on August 31, 2017 at 6:30 p.m. MDT when the subchannel returned to WeatherNation TV. On December 29, 2018, KUSA dropped WeatherNation TV from the channel and switched to Cozi TV.

In late January 2015, KUSA began to broadcast a duplicate 1080i signal of their primary digital subchannel (9.1) on the KTVD (RF 31) transmitter as digital subchannel 9.4, "KUSA-HD". This allows viewers with issues receiving KUSA's VHF signal or with a UHF-only antenna to view KUSA in some form over the air.

Analog-to-digital conversion
KUSA shut down its analog signal, over VHF channel 9, on April 16, 2009. The station's digital signal relocated from its pre-transition UHF channel 16 to VHF channel 9.

Translators
KUSA operates a large network of translators to relay its signal to portions of Colorado, Nebraska and Wyoming within and adjacent to the Denver market (all translators on this list are in Colorado unless otherwise listed).

See also
 List of news aircraft accidents and incidents

References

External links

NBC network affiliates
Cozi TV affiliates
True Crime Network affiliates
Quest (American TV network) affiliates
Circle (TV network) affiliates
Tegna Inc.
USA (TV)
Television channels and stations established in 1952
1952 establishments in Colorado
Former Gannett subsidiaries